Peroxisome assembly protein 12 is a protein that in humans is encoded by the PEX12 gene.

Function 

PEX12 is needed for protein import into peroxisomes. This gene belongs to the peroxin-12 family. Peroxins (PEXs) are proteins that are essential for the assembly of functional peroxisomes.

Clinical significance 

The peroxisome biogenesis disorders (PBDs; MIM 601539) are a group of genetically heterogeneous diseases that are usually lethal in early infancy. Although the clinical features of PBD patients vary, cells from all PBD patients exhibit a defect in the import of one or more classes of peroxisomal matrix proteins into the organelle. This cellular phenotype is shared by yeast 'pex' mutants, and human orthologs of yeast PEX genes defective in some PBD complementation groups (CGs).

Interactions
PEX12 has been shown to interact with PEX10, PEX5 and PEX19.

References

Further reading

External links
  GeneReviews/NCBI/NIH/UW entry on Peroxisome Biogenesis Disorders, Zellweger Syndrome Spectrum
 OMIM entries on Peroxisome Biogenesis Disorders, Zellweger Syndrome Spectrum